Asaad Abdulameer Al Eidani (born 1 January 1967) is an Iraqi politician and businessman who has been the Governor of Basra Province since August 2017. He is also deputy secretary-general of the Iraqi National Congress Party.

References

External links
 An Interview with Asaad Al Eidani (Video in Arabic with English subtitles)

Governors of Basra Governorate
Iraqi politicians
Living people
People from Basra
1967 births
University of Basrah alumni